WNSC may refer to:

WNSC-FM 
WNSC-TV